Helge Alexander Jansson (1 June 1904 – 17 October 1989) was a Swedish athlete. He competed at the 1924 and 1928 Olympics and finished in seventh and sixth place in the decathlon, respectively; in 1924 he was also sixth in the high jump with a result of 1.85 m, three centimeters below his personal best.

References

1904 births
1989 deaths
Swedish decathletes
Swedish male high jumpers
Olympic athletes of Sweden
Athletes (track and field) at the 1924 Summer Olympics
Athletes (track and field) at the 1928 Summer Olympics
Olympic decathletes